"Hope" is a song by American rapper NF, released on February 16, 2023 as the lead single from his upcoming fifth studio album of the same name. Written with Tommee Profitt, the two produced it with Jeff Sojka and Patrick Tohill.

Composition
The song is split into two parts. In terms of production, it begins with "plucky" piano chords before segueing into staccato stringed instruments and a pulsing echo of voices in the background, and features tempo changes and crescendos. Lyrically, the song deals with NF overcoming his internal conflicts, as he raps about topics such as faith, fatherhood, pain and success, especially on trusting one's gut and being authentic while still holding onto the best qualities of oneself. In the second part, he reflects on his past self and focuses on being a voice of reason without giving up the qualities of who he once was.

Critical reception
Wonderland gave a positive review of the song: "'Hope' is dramatic and cinematic, expertly crafted in its build up to a rousing climatic. NF brings the nuanced delivery and thoughtful lyricism that we have grown to love from him."

Music video
The official music video, released on the same day as the song, was directed by NF and Patrick Tohill. It opens with NF stranded on a wooden raft in the middle of an ocean and in an all-white outfit, rapping as he finds his way to the shore. Later, a clone of himself clothed entirely in black pushes NF through the roof of an abandoned mansion. Wandering through, NF confronts a different version of himself in every room he enters, each of them representing NF during a particular era of his musical career. He is eventually transported to a mountain top, looking lost as he raps.

Charts

References

2023 singles
2023 songs
NF (rapper) songs
Songs written by NF (rapper)
Songs written by Tommee Profitt